Yeonsu Girls' High School (연수 여자 고등학교) is a Korean high school located in the Yeonsu District, within the Incheon metropolitan area. The school has over 1000 students and 70 teachers. The school is located at 9 Meonugeum-ro 141beon-gil, Yeonsu-gu, Incheon.

References

External links 
 Official website

Schools in Incheon